The Bewitching Braid is a 1996 film directed by Cai Yuanyuan (蔡元元) and produced by Cai An'an (蔡安安 aka "Choi Unun"). It was the first film produced in Macau.

The Cai brothers hoped to make a film that showcased the territory. The production company was jointly owned by the two brothers.

The budgeting of the film, shot in 1995, was for 8,000,000 Macau patacas, with 2,000,000 patacas of that used for distribution purposes. It is an adaptation of  written by Henrique de Senna Fernandes, written originally in Portuguese as A Trança Feiticeira; the English translation of this novel was published under the same English name, The Bewitching Braid, by Hong Kong University Press.

Most of the filming locations were in Portuguese Macau and Zhuhai.

The film is about a relationship between a Portuguese man and a Chinese woman. The story is set in the 1930s.

Cast 
  as Adozindo
 Ning Jing as A-Leng
  as Adozindo's father
 
 Roberto Candeias as Florêncio

References

Further reading
 
  - Published on Sohu News

External links
 
 The source novel on Google Books (English translation published by Hong Kong University Press, 2004, translation by David Brookshaw)
 Distributed in the United States by University of Chicago Press

Films shot in Macau
Zhuhai
Portuguese Macau
1996 films
Films set in the 1930s
Films shot in Guangdong